Claire Bouilhac (born 1970) is a French bande dessinée illustrator, scriptwriter, and colorist, working in particular for Spirou and Fluide Glacial. She mainly draws the series Maude Mutante, and Melody Bondage.

Biography
Claire Bouilhac was born in 1970. From 1994, she teamed up with scriptwriter  for the series Francis Blaireau Farceur, which has seven volumes and a special issue.

Bouilhac has collaborated with Catel Muller on several occasions; the two met on the sidelines of the Angoulême International Comics Festival and found affinities, particularly in terms of feminism.
They collaborated on the Top Linotte series and on two biographies: Rose Valland, captain Beaux-Arts (2009) and another on Mylène Demongeot, Adieu Kharkov (2015), with preface by Pierre Richard. The two authors begin their work with Les lilas de Kharkov but, after lengthy interviews with the actress, they retraced her life and that of her mother, Claudia. The realization of the album took three years, from period photos. In the wake of this work, an exhibition on this graphic novel was held at Château-Gontier.

In 2019, she collaborated with Catel Muller on a comic book adaptation of La Princesse de Clèves.

Awards and honours

 2022,  (with Yves Poinot)

Selected works

Series

Francis Blaireau Farceur
 No. 1 Francis blaireau farceur, scriptwriter, Jake Raynal, designer, Claire Bouilhac, coloring, B&W, 1994,  "Delphine" 
 No. 2 Francis veut mourir (scriptwriter, Jake Raynal; designer, Claire Bouilhac; coloring), B&W, 1996, Cornélius coll. "Delphine" 
 No. 3 Francis cherche l'amour (scriptwriter, Jake Raynal; designer, Claire Bouilhac; colorist, B&W), 1997, Cornélius coll. "Delphine" 
 No. 4 Francis sauve le mond (scriptwriter, Jake Raynal; designer, Claire Bouilhac; colorist, B&W), 2005, Cornélius coll. "Delphine" 
 No. 5 Francis rate sa vie (scriptwriter, Jake Raynal; designer, Claire Bouilhac; colorist, B&W), 2009, Cornélius coll. "Delphine" 
 No. 6 Francis est malade (scriptwriter, Jake Raynal; designer, Claire Bouilhac; coloring, B&W), 2013, Cornélius coll. "Delphine" 
 No. 7 Francis est papa (scriptwriter, Jake Raynal; designer, Claire Bouilhac; colorist, B&W), 2017, Cornélius coll. "Delphine" 
 Special edition, Francis (scriptwriter, Jake Raynal; designer, Claire Bouilhac; colorist, B&W), 2013, Cornélius coll. "Delphine"

Top Linotte
 No. 2 Trop Pimpon (scriptwriter, Catel and Claire Bouilhac; designer, Catel; colorist, Nathalie Plee), 2012, Dupuis 
 No. 3 Trop classe (scriptwriters and designers, Catel and Claire Bouilhac; colorist, Claire Bouilhac and Nathalie Plee) 2013, Dupuis

One-shots
 Melody Bondage : My name is bondage (scriptwriter, Jake Raynal; designer and colorist, Claire Bouilhac), 2003, Audie 
 Rose Valland, capitaine Beaux-Arts (scriptwriters, Claire Bouilhac and Emmanuelle Polack; designer, Catel; colorist, Claire Champeval, 2009, Dupuis 
 Adieu Kharkov (scriptwriters, Mylène Demongeot and Claire Bouilhac; designers, Catel and Claire Bouilhac; colorist, Claire Bouilhac, Marie-Anne Didierjean, and Meephe Versaevel, 2015, Dupuis Coll. "Aire Libre"

Collectives 
 Cornélius ou l'art de la mouscaille et du pinaillage, Cornélius, coll. "Gilbet", 2007 
  2. Les artistes se mobilisent pour le respect des droits des femmes,  / Amnesty International, 2011 
 Hommage à Bécassine, Gautier-Languereau, 2016 
 Raymond Devos, Jungle ! / Plon, 2017

References

Bibliography

External links
 

1970 births
Living people
French illustrators
French comics artists
French comics writers